Kristin Moen Skaslien (born 18 January 1986) is a Norwegian curler from Fornebu. She currently throws fourth stones on Team Marianne Rørvik.

She was lead for the Norwegian team at the 2009 Mount Titlis World Women's Curling Championship in Gangneung, Korea, the 2010 Ford World Women's Curling Championship in Swift Current, Canada. the 2011 Capital One World Women's Curling Championship in Esbjerg, Denmark and the 2015 World Women's Curling Championship in Sapporo, Japan.

Mixed doubles career
In mixed doubles, Skaslien and partner Magnus Nedregotten have represented Norway in the 2013, 2014, 2015, 2016, 2017 and 2019 World Mixed Doubles Curling Championship. The pair have finished 4th, 5th, 3rd, 9th, 5th and 9th respectively. They represented Norway in the mixed doubles tournament at the 2018 Winter Olympics. They lost the bronze medal game against the Olympic Athletes from Russia, but due to a positive testing of meldonium from Alexander Krushelnitskiy, their bronze medals were stripped and given to Nedregotten and Skaslien.

Skaslien and Nedregotten won the second leg and Grand Final of the 2018–19 Curling World Cup, defeating Switzerland's Jenny Perret and Martin Rios in the final of the second leg and Canada's Laura Walker and Kirk Muyres in the grand final. In the first leg, Skaslien was paired with Sander Rølvåg but missed the final and was paired with Thomas Ulsrud in the third leg, where she lost in the final to Canada's Kadriana Sahaidak and Colton Lott.

Personal life
Skaslien works as an operations analyst at Wilhelmsen Ships Service. She has an engineering degree in logistics from the Oslo and Akershus University College of Applied Sciences and a Master's in technology management from Trondheim Business School.

She is married to her mixed doubles partner, Magnus Nedregotten.

References

External links
 
 
 

Norwegian female curlers
Living people
1986 births
Curlers at the 2018 Winter Olympics
Curlers at the 2022 Winter Olympics
Olympic curlers of Norway
Olympic silver medalists for Norway
Olympic bronze medalists for Norway
Olympic medalists in curling
Medalists at the 2018 Winter Olympics
Medalists at the 2022 Winter Olympics
Sportspeople from Trondheim
Sportspeople from Oslo
Sportspeople from Bærum
21st-century Norwegian women